April is the surname of:

People
 Bobby April (born 1953), American National Football League coach
 Bobby April III, American football coach, son of the above
 Brendon April (born 1993), South African rugby union player
 Ernest April, American anatomist who defended the use of Nazi medical drawings in anatomy textbooks
 Heinrich April, South African politician
 Raymonde April (born 1953), Canadian contemporary artist, photographer and academic

Characters
 Robert April, a character in the Star Trek universe

See also

 Abril
 April (given name)
 Avril (name)
 
 April (disambiguation)